is a typical Japanese dish usually consisting of seafood, meat and vegetables that have been battered and deep fried. The dish was introduced by the Portuguese in Nagasaki through fritter-cooking techniques in the 16th century. The word tempura comes from the Latin word , a term referring to times of fasting when the church dictated that Catholics go meatless.

Preparation

Batter
A light batter is made of iced water, eggs, and soft wheat flour (cake, pastry or all-purpose flour). Sometimes baking soda or baking powder is added to make the fritter light. Using sparkling water in the place of plain water makes a similar effect. Tempura batter is traditionally mixed in small batches using chopsticks for only a few seconds, leaving lumps in the mixture that, along with the cold batter temperature, result in the unique fluffy and crisp tempura structure when cooked. The batter is often kept cold by adding ice or placing the bowl inside a larger bowl with ice. Overmixing the batter will activate wheat gluten, which causes the flour mixture to become soft and dough-like when fried.

Specially formulated tempura flour is available in supermarkets. This is generally light (low-gluten) flour and occasionally contains leaveners such as baking powder.

Tempura does not use breadcrumbs (panko) in the coating. Deep-fried foods which are coated with breadcrumbs are called furai, Japanese-invented Western-style deep fried foods, such as tonkatsu or ebi furai (fried prawn).

No seasonings or salt is added to the batter, or the ingredients, except for some recipes recommending rinsing seafood in salt water before preparation.

Frying

Thin slices or strips of vegetables or seafood are dipped in the batter, then briefly deep-fried in hot oil. Vegetable oil or canola oil are most common; however, tempura was traditionally cooked using sesame oil. Many specialty shops still use sesame oil or tea seed oil, and it is thought certain compounds in these oils help to produce light, crispier batter.

The finished fry is pale whiteish, thin and fluffy, yet crunchy.

The bits of batter (known as tenkasu) are scooped out between batches of tempura so they do not burn and leave a bad flavor in the oil. A small mesh scoop (Ami jakushi) is used for this purpose. Tenkasu are often reserved as ingredients in other dishes or as a topping.

Ingredients
Various seafood and vegetables are commonly used as the ingredients in traditional tempura.

Seafood

The most popular seafood tempura is probably ebi (shrimp) tempura. Types of seafood used in tempura include:

 prawn – Ebi tempura
 shrimp
 squid
 scallop
 crab
 ayu (sweetfish)
 anago (conger eel)
 fish
 Catfish
 white fish
 cod
 haddock
 pollock
 coley
 plaice
 skate
 ray
 Huss (Various fish species including Galeorhinus, Mustelus, Scyliorhinus, Galeus melastomus, Squalus acanthias – also known as Spiny dogfish or "Rock salmon")
 rock salmon (a term covering several species of dogfish and similar fish)
 whiting
 Japanese whiting – kisu
 Sea bass
 Sea perch

Vegetables

Vegetables tempura is called yasai tempura. The all-vegetable tempura might be served as a vegetarian dish. Types of vegetables include:

 bamboo shoots
 bell pepper
 broccoli
 butternut squash
 carrot
 eggplant
 gobo (burdock, Arctium lappa)
 ginger
 green beans
 kabocha squash
 mushrooms
 maitake mushroom
 shiitake mushroom
 okra
 onion
 pumpkin
 potato
 renkon (lotus root)
 seaweed
 shishito pepper
 shiso leaf
 sweet potato
 yam

Serving and presentation

Cooked pieces of tempura are either eaten with dipping sauce, salted without sauce, or used to assemble other dishes. Tempura is commonly served with grated daikon and eaten hot immediately after frying. In Japan, it is often found in bowls of soba or udon soup in the form of shrimp, shiso leaf, or fritter.  The most common sauce is tentsuyu sauce (roughly three parts dashi, one part mirin, and one part shōyu). Alternatively, skim tempura may be sprinkled with sea salt before eating. Mixtures of powdered green tea and salt or yuzu and salt are also used.
 is a type of tempura made with mixed vegetable strips, such as onion, carrot, and burdock, and sometimes including shrimp or squid, which are deep fried as small round fritters.

Tempura is also used in combination with other foods. When served over soba (buckwheat noodles), it is called tempura soba or tensoba. Tempura is also served as a donburi dish where tempura shrimp and vegetables are served over steamed rice in a bowl (tendon) and on top of udon soup (tempura udon).

History

Origins
Earlier Japanese deep-fried food was either simply fried without breading or batter or fried with rice flour.  However, toward the end of the 16th century, the technique of fritter-cooking with a batter of flour and eggs was acquired in Nagasaki from Portuguese missionaries. It was a way to fulfill the fasting and abstinence rules for Catholics surrounding the quarterly ember days (Spanish: Témporas)..  Portuguese and Spanish, both Neo-Latin languages, inherited Têmpora and Témpora from the Latin .  Hence the etymology of the word. In those days, tempura was deep-fried in lard with a batter of flour, water, eggs, and salt; unlike today, it was eaten without dipping sauce.

In the early 17th century, around the Tokyo Bay area, tempura ingredients and preparation underwent a remarkable change as the Yatai (food cart) culture gained popularity. Making the best use of fresh seafood while preserving its delicate taste, tempura used only flour, eggs, and water as ingredients, and the batter was not flavored.  As the batter was mixed minimally in cold water, it avoided the dough-like stickiness caused by the activation of wheat gluten, resulting in the crispy texture, which is now characteristic of tempura. It became customary to dip tempura quickly in a sauce mixed with grated daikon just before eating it.

Today in Japan, the mainstream of tempura recipes originate from "Tokyo style (Edo style)" tempura, invented at the food stalls along the riverside fish market in the Edo period.  The main reason tempura became popular was the abundance of seafood. In addition, as oil extraction techniques advanced, cooking oil became cheaper. Serving of deep-fried food indoors was prohibited during Edo because tempura oil was a fire hazard in Japanese buildings, which were made of paper and wood. Therefore, tempura gained popularity as fast food eaten at outdoor food stalls. It was skewered and eaten with a dipping sauce.  Tempura is considered one of "the Edo Delicacies" along with soba (buckwheat noodles) and sushi, which were also food-stall take-outs.

The modern tempura recipe was first published in 1671 in the cookbook called "料理献立抄". After the Meiji period, tempura was no longer considered a fast food item but developed as a high-class cuisine.

Etymology

The word "tempura", or the technique of dipping fish and vegetables into a batter and frying them, comes from the word , a Latin word meaning "times", "time period" used by both Spanish and Portuguese missionaries to refer to the Lenten period or Ember Days (ad tempora quadragesima), Fridays, and other Christian holy days. The idea that the word "tempura" may have been derived from the Portuguese noun , meaning a condiment or seasoning of any kind, or from the verb , meaning "to season" is also possible as the Japanese language could easily have assumed the word  as is, without changing any vowels as the Portuguese pronunciation in this case is similar to the Japanese. There is still today a dish in Portugal very similar to tempura called peixinhos da horta, "garden fishes", which consists of green beans dipped in a batter and fried.

The term "tempura" is thought to have gained popularity in southern Japan; it became widely used to refer to any food prepared using hot oil, including some already existing Japanese foods. Today, particularly in western Japan, the word "tempura" is also commonly used to refer to satsuma-age, fried surimi fish cake which is made without batter.

Variations

Japan
In Japan, restaurants specializing in tempura are called tenpura-ya. Many restaurants offer tempura as part of a set meal or a bento (lunch box), and it is also a popular ingredient in take-out or convenience store bento boxes.  The ingredients and styles of cooking and serving tempura vary greatly throughout the country, with importance placed on using fresh, seasonal ingredients.

Outside Japan

Outside Japan (as well as recently in Japan), there are many nontraditional and fusion uses of tempura. Chefs over the world include tempura dishes on their menus, and a wide variety of different batters and ingredients are used, including the nontraditional broccoli, zucchini, asparagus and chuchu. More unusual ingredients may include nori slices, dry fruit such as banana, and ice cream (tempura-based fried ice cream). American restaurants are known to serve tempura in the form of various types of meat, particularly chicken and cheeses, usually mozzarella. A variation is to use panko (breadcrumbs), which results in a crisper consistency than tempura batter, although in Japan this would be classified as a furai dish. Tempura (particularly shrimp) is often used as a filling in makizushi. A more recent variation of tempura sushi has entire pieces of sushi dipped in batter and tempura-fried.

In Bangladesh, the blossoms of pumpkins or marrows are often deep fried with a gram of rice flour spice mix, creating a Bengali-style tempura known as kumro ful bhaja.

Taiwan
In Taiwan, tempura, as described in the preceding, is known as tiānfùluó and can commonly be found on the menu in Japanese restaurants all over the island. A similar-sounding dish, tianbula is usually sold at night markets. Tianbula is Japanese satsuma-age and was introduced to Taiwan under Japanese rule by people from Kyushu, where satsuma-age is commonly known as tempura.

See also
 Glossary of Japanese words of Portuguese origin

 List of Japanese dishes#Deep-fried dishes (agemono, 揚げ物)
 Ebi furai: a Japanese dish of breaded and deep-fried shrimp.
 Karaage: a Japanese cooking technique in which various foods—-most often chicken, but other meat and fish—-are coated with flour and deep-fried in oil.
 Kushikatsu: a Japanese dish of breaded and deep-fried skewered meat and vegetables.
 Tonkatsu: Japanese breaded and deep-fried pork cutlet.
 Toriten: a Japanese fritter of marinated chicken.
 Karakudamono: a Japanese term used to collectively describe assorted pastry confections of Chinese origin (also called togashi).
 Unbreaded fritters:
 Crispy kangkóng: Filipino deep-fried water spinach leaves in batter.
 Pakora: a South Asian food resembling tempura.
 Okoy: Filipino shrimp fritters.
 Camaron rebosado: Filipino deep-fried battered shrimp.
 Gambas con gabardina: Spanish deep-fried battered shrimp.

References

Deep fried foods
Easter food
Japanese cuisine terms
Japanese fusion cuisine
National dishes
Portuguese fusion cuisine
Seafood and rice dishes
Shrimp dishes